Giacomo Medici, marquess of Vascello (Salerno, 1 April 1883 – Venaria Reale, 15 August 1949) was an Italian Fascist politician who served as Undersecretary to the Presidency of the Council of the Kingdom of Italy from 1935 to 1939. He was the grandson of Risorgimento general Giacomo Medici.

Biography

Holder of a degree in engineering, he owned industrial and agricultural businesses. He had two children, Luigi Francesco and Elvina.

In 1929 and again in 1934 he was elected to the Italian Chamber of Deputies, serving as undersecretary to the presidency of the council of the Mussolini Cabinet from 1935 to 1939. He held the rank of console generale (brigadier general) of the Volunteer Militia for National Security. In 1939 he became a member of the Chamber of Fasces and Corporations.

References

1883 births
1949 deaths
Mussolini Cabinet
National Fascist Party politicians
Members of the Chamber of Fasces and Corporations
Members of the Chamber of Deputies (Kingdom of Italy)

it:Giacomo Medici Del Vascello